Martensia denticulata is a species of red algae.

References

Species described in 1855
Delesseriaceae